The Wings of Eagles is a 1957 American Metrocolor film starring John Wayne, Dan Dailey and Maureen O'Hara, based on the life of Frank "Spig" Wead and the history of U.S. Naval aviation from its inception through World War II. The film is a tribute to Wead (who died ten years earlier, in 1947, at the age of 52) from his friend, director John Ford, and was based on Wead's "We Plaster the Japs", published in a 1944 issue of The American Magazine.

John Wayne plays naval aviator-turned-screenwriter Wead, who wrote the story or screenplay for such films as Hell Divers (1931) with Wallace Beery and Clark Gable, Ceiling Zero (1936) with James Cagney, and the Oscar-nominated World War II drama They Were Expendable (1945) in which Wayne co-starred with Robert Montgomery.

The supporting cast features Ward Bond, Ken Curtis, Edmund Lowe and Kenneth Tobey. This film was the third of five in which Wayne and O'Hara appeared together; others were Rio Grande (1950), The Quiet Man (1952), McLintock! (1963) and Big Jake (1971).

Plot
Soon after World War I is over, Naval Aviator "Spig" Wead (John Wayne), along with John Dale Price (Ken Curtis), tries to prove to the Navy the value of aviation in combat. To do this, Wead pushes the Navy to compete in racing and endurance competitions. Several races are against the US Army aviation team led by Captain Herbert Allen Hazard (based on General Jimmy Doolittle—played by Kenneth Tobey).

Wead spends most of his time either flying or horsing around with his teammates, meaning that his wife Minnie, or "Min" (Maureen O'Hara), and children are ignored.

The night Wead is promoted to fighter squadron commander, he falls down a flight of stairs at home, breaks his neck and is paralyzed. When "Min" tries to console him he rejects her and the family. He will only let his Navy mates like "Jughead" Carson (Dan Dailey) and Price near him. "Jughead" visits the hospital almost daily to encourage Frank's rehabilitation ("I'm gonna move that toe"). Carson also pushes "Spig" to get over his depression, try to walk, and start writing. Wead achieves some success in all three goals.

After great success in Hollywood, Wead returns to active sea duty with the Navy in World War II, developing the idea of smaller escort, or "jeep," carriers which follow behind the main fleet as auxiliary strength to the main aircraft carrier force. He returns to active combat duty in the Pacific, witnessing first hand kamikaze attacks. The film's battle scenes, based around aircraft carriers, include real combat footage. Following a 50-hour shift during combat operations, Wead has a heart attack and is retired home before the war ends. When he leaves the carrier he is serving in for the last time, he receives eight side boys in honor of his contributions to aviation—all of them Navy admirals or Army generals.

Director John Ford is represented in the film in the character of film director John Dodge, played by Ward Bond.

Cast
 John Wayne as Frank "Spig" Wead
 Dan Dailey as "Jughead" Carson
 Maureen O'Hara as Min Wead
 Ward Bond as John Dodge
 Ken Curtis as John Dale Price[Price is credited as film's technical adviser]
 Edmund Lowe as Admiral Moffett
 Kenneth Tobey as Capt. Herbert Allen Hazard
 James Todd as Jack Travis
 Barry Kelley as Captain Clark
 Sig Ruman as Manager
 Henry O'Neill as Capt. Spear
 Willis Bouchey as Barton
 Dorothy Jordan as Rose Brentmann
 Charles Trowbridge as Adm. Crown (uncredited)
 Blue Washington as Bartender (uncredited)

Historical inaccuracies
Dramatic license allows for some historical inaccuracies in the film. One scene shows first the US Army around-the-world flight and then the US Navy winning the Schneider Cup. In fact the US Navy won the Schneider Cup in 1923 and the US Army embarked on the first aerial circumnavigation from March to September 1924.

Another scene shows a newsreel related to the sinking of the aircraft carrier USS Hornet (CV-8), suggesting that she had been doomed by the hit of three kamikaze suicide planes. Although two aircraft did crash into her, she also received substantial damage by bombs and torpedoes before finally being sunk by Japanese destroyers. Additionally, the term "kamikaze" was not in use to describe suicide pilots at the time of Hornet'''s sinking.

Box office
MGM reported that the film earned $2.3 million in the U.S. and Canada, and $1,350,000 elsewhere, resulting in a loss of $804,000.

Comic book adaptation
 Dell Four Color #790 (April 1957)

See also
 List of American films of 1957
 The Court-Martial of Billy Mitchell'' (1955), a similar film about the birth of US Army aviation

References

External links
 
 
 
 
 
 Article at Turner Classic Movies website

1957 films
American war drama films
American aviation films
1950s war drama films
Films directed by John Ford
Metro-Goldwyn-Mayer films
Films adapted into comics
1957 drama films
Biographical films about aviators
1950s English-language films
1950s American films